The Clydesdale Bank £50 note was a sterling banknote. Until its withdrawal it was the second largest denomination of banknote issued by the Clydesdale Bank. The last cotton note, first issued in 2009 bears a portrait of Elsie Inglis, founder of the Scottish Women's Hospitals, on the obverse and an image of the Antonine Wall on the reverse.

History
The Clydesdale Bank began issuing banknotes (although not in £50 denominations) in 1838, the same year as the bank's founding. Early banknotes were monochrome, and printed on one side only. The issuing of banknotes by Scottish banks was regulated by the Banknote (Scotland) Act 1845 until it was superseded by the Banking Act 2009. Though strictly not legal tender in Scotland, Scottish banknotes are nevertheless legal currency and are generally accepted throughout the United Kingdom. Scottish banknotes are fully backed such that holders have the same level of protection as those holding genuine Bank of England notes. The £50 note was the second largest denomination of banknote issued by the Clydesdale Bank.

The Famous Scots issue of the £50 note featuring economist Adam Smith was introduced in 1981. On the reverse of this note are several images representing engineering and agricultural machinery in the eighteenth century. The current World Heritage series £50 note was introduced in 2009. This note features a portrait of Elsie Inglis on the front, and an image of the Antonine Wall on the back.

The Clydesdale Bank £50 note was withdrawn from circulation on 30 September 2022. At present no successor polymer note has been issued.

Designs

Information taken from The Committee of Scottish Bankers website.

References

External links

The Committee of Scottish Bankers website

Banknotes of Scotland
Fifty-base-unit banknotes
Clydesdale Bank